Selaru is an island in Indonesia in the Tanimbar Islands group, Southeast Maluku. It is located south of Yamdena. It is one of the 92 officially listed outlying islands of Indonesia.

See also

Tanimbar Islands

External links

Languages of Indonesia (Maluku)
Selaru song

Tanimbar Islands
Populated places in Indonesia
Islands of Indonesia